Dr. Alaka Desai Sarma (mostly known as Alaka Sarma) is a two-time MLA from the Nalbari constituency of Assam Legislative assembly, and a woman activist, who joined Asom Gana Parishad after her husband's death. Sarma first won the by-poll following the death of then MLA Nagen Sarma of the Nalbari constituency in 2000 for a period of 1 year. In 2001, Sarma lost to Indian National Congress candidate Madan Kalita.  In 2006, Sarma won the Assam Legislative assembly election from the Nalbari constituency.

In 2019, Sarma was appointed Commissioner of 'Parents Responsibility and Norms for Accountability and Monitoring (PRANAM) Commission' by the Assam government.

Dr. Alaka Sarma was the wife of the former Assam PWD minister Nagen Sarma, who was assassinated by ULFA on 27 February 2000.

Footnotes 
 Assam Legislative Assembly election, 2006 : Nalbari

References 

Asom Gana Parishad politicians
People from Nalbari district
Year of birth missing (living people)
Living people
Assam MLAs 1996–2001
Assam MLAs 2006–2011